Hurnet Dekkers (born 8 May 1974 in Rossum, Gelderland) is a Dutch rower.

References 
 
 

1974 births
Living people
Dutch female rowers
Rowers at the 2004 Summer Olympics
Olympic bronze medalists for the Netherlands
Olympic rowers of the Netherlands
Olympic medalists in rowing
People from Maasdriel
Medalists at the 2004 Summer Olympics
World Rowing Championships medalists for the Netherlands
20th-century Dutch women
21st-century Dutch women
Sportspeople from Gelderland